The Listening is an American rock band originally from Washington and currently based out of Franklin, Tennessee.  Touring extensively through North America and Europe from 2004–2006, the group largely disappeared over the following years until it resurfaced midway through 2008, announcing the release of a new EP before the end of the year; Gabriel Wilson is now a worship leader and an integral part of the music program at Bethel Church in Redding, CA while Josiah and Nolan remain in Tennessee. Jason now lives in Folsom, CA. The Listening still collaborates with each other by exchanging ideas and instrument tracks through the web. A new LP entitled "LMNOP" is being worked on with no clear due date in mind.

Discography 
2004 The Listening EP (L-Town Music Group, Fierce UK)
2005 The Listening LP (L-Town Music Group)
2008 Transmission 1 EP (L-Town Music Group)

Members 

 Gabriel Wilson: vocals, guitar, rhodes (2004–present)
 Nolan Russom: drums, vocals (2007–present)
 Josiah Schmidt: keys, pads, synths, moogs, guitar (2007–present)
 Jason Miller: guitar, bass, fuzz, moog (2009–present)

Former members 

 Kyle Reid: bass, fuzz, moogs (2008–2009)
 Chris Greely: (2004–2007)
 Eric Lemiere: (2004–2007)
 Josiah Sherman (2004–2007)

External links 
 
 
 

Alternative rock groups from Washington (state)
Christian rock groups from Washington (state)
Musical groups established in 2004